The Scarlet Drop is a 1918 American silent Western film directed by John Ford and featuring Harry Carey. Just over 30 minutes of footage of the film now survives in the Getty Images Archive.

Plot
As described in a film magazine, "Kaintuck" Ridge (Carey), refused admission to the local militia to fight on the side of Union in the American Civil War, joins a gang of marauders and at the end of the conflict finds himself a fugitive with a price on his head. He goes west and becomes a bandit. Marley Calvert (Pegg), who kept Kaintuck out of the army, also goes west and takes up mining. Betty Calvert (Schade) is taken captive when Kaintuck holds up a stage coach. His hatred for the Calverts is overcome by his admiration for Molly (Malone) and later, when her honor is attacked by a former suitor, he defends her and wins her love.

Cast
 Harry Carey as "Kaintuck" Harry Ridge
 Molly Malone as Molly Calvert
 Vester Pegg as Marley Calvert
 Betty Schade as Betty Calvert
 Millard K. Wilson as Graham Lyons (credited as M.K. Wilson)
 Martha Mattox as Mammy
 Steve Clemente as Buck (credited as Steve Clemento)

Reception
Like many American films of the time, The Scarlet Drop was subject to cuts by city and state film censorship boards. For example, the Chicago Board of Censors issued an Adults Only permit for the film and cut, in Reel 2, the shooting of man standing in church yard, Reel 3, placing tree in road, all scenes of coach holdup except where young woman and bandit are conversing, two scenes of outlaws taking spoils from passengers, Reel 5, three fight scenes were man presses knife towards opponent, two scenes of men throwing knives, and man shooting Ridge.

See also
 Harry Carey filmography
 List of incomplete or partially lost films

References

External links
 

1918 films
1918 Western (genre) films
American black-and-white films
Films directed by John Ford
American Civil War films
Universal Pictures films
Silent American Western (genre) films
1910s American films
1910s English-language films